Kaos Studios was an American video game developer based in New York City, New York. Founded in 2006, the company was most known for developing Frontlines: Fuel of War (2008) and Homefront (2011). It was a subsidiary of publisher THQ until it was shut down in June 2011.

History
Kaos Studios was formed in 2006 when publisher THQ hired the core members of Trauma Studios (having been acquired and then shut down by EA) the team behind the popular Desert Combat modification for Battlefield 1942, to create a new studio based to focus on first-person shooter video games.

In February 2008, Kaos Studios released their first game, Frontlines: Fuel of War, for Microsoft Windows and Xbox 360. In March 2009, THQ announced that Kaos Studios was recruiting for their then-upcoming game Homefront. Homefront was released on March 15, 2011 for Microsoft Windows, PlayStation 3 and Xbox 360 in North America, with the European release set a week later.

In March 2011, THQ, after its game Homefront was released, suffered a 26% stock drop. The large drop was speculated to be a result of Homefronts less than expected reception. On June 13, 2011, THQ announced the closure of Kaos Studios.  In the meantime, Homefront development team has been transferred to the company's Montreal studio. Its first planned for THQ's Montreal studio to take over product development and overall creative management for the Homefront franchise. In September 2011 THQ confirmed that a sequel to Homefront was in development, but later was announced that the game would be developed by Crytek UK instead. After THQ filed for bankruptcy in December 2012, Crytek would acquire the rights to the franchise for US$544,218 at the January 22, 2013 auction. At same day Ubisoft acquired THQ Montreal with approximately 170 employees and with rights to new yet-to-be announced IP in development at the studio for $2.5 million.

Games developed

See also
 2 Dawn Games

References

THQ
Defunct companies based in New York City
Video game companies established in 2006
Video game companies disestablished in 2011
Defunct video game companies of the United States
Video game development companies